Peter O'Reilly (1916 - April 1994) was an Irish Gaelic football manager, coach and player. His championship career at senior level with the Dublin county team lasted for several seasons throughout the 1940s. His older brother Joe O'Reilly was an Irish international soccer player in the 1930s.

O'Reilly first came to prominence on the inter-county scene as a member of the Dublin senior team in 1941 when he won his first Leinster medal. He won a second Leinster medal in 1942 before later claiming an All-Ireland medal following a defeat of Galway.

As a member of the Leinster inter-provincial team on several occasions, O'Reilly won back-to-back Railway Cup medals in 1944 and 1945.

Even during his playing days O'Reilly was heavily involved in coaching and team management. He trained the Dublin team that won the All-Ireland title in 1942 before repeating the feat in 1958. O'Reilly later guided Offaly to a first All-Ireland final appearance in 1961. His coaching career ended with a spell in charge of Kildare in the late 1960s.

Honours

Player
Dublin
All-Ireland Senior Football Championship (1): 1942
Leinster Senior Football Championship (2): 1941, 1942

Leinster
Railway Cup (2): 1944, 1945

Manager
Dublin
All-Ireland Senior Football Championship (2): 1942, 1958
Leinster Senior Football Championship (5): 1941, 1942, 1955, 1958, 1959

Offaly
Leinster Senior Football Championship (2): 1960, 1961

References

1916 births
1994 deaths
Dublin inter-county Gaelic footballers
Gaelic football managers
Leinster inter-provincial Gaelic footballers
St Mary's (Dublin) Gaelic footballers